Flounders are a group of flatfish species. They are demersal fish, found at the bottom of oceans around the world; some species will also enter estuaries.

Taxonomy 
The name "flounder" is used for several only distantly related species, though all are in the suborder Pleuronectoidei (families Achiropsettidae, Bothidae, Pleuronectidae, Paralichthyidae, and Samaridae). Some of the better known species that are important in fisheries are:
 Western Atlantic
 Gulf flounder – Paralichthys albigutta
 Southern flounder – Paralichthys lethostigma
 Summer flounder (also known as fluke) – Paralichthys dentatus
 Winter flounder – Pseudopleuronectes americanus
 European waters
European flounder – Platichthys flesus
Witch flounder – Glyptocephalus cynoglossus
 North Pacific
 Halibut – Hippoglossus stenolepis
 Olive flounder – Paralichthys olivaceus

Eye migration 

Larval flounder are born with one eye on each side of their head, but as they grow from the larval to juvenile stage through metamorphosis, one eye migrates to the other side of the body. As a result, both eyes are then on the side which faces up. The side to which the eyes migrate is dependent on the species type. As an adult, a flounder changes its habits and camouflages itself by lying on the bottom of the ocean floor as protection against predators.

Habitat 
Flounders ambush their prey, feeding at soft muddy areas of the sea bottom, near bridge piles, docks, and coral reefs.

A flounder's diet consists mainly of fish spawn, crustaceans, polychaetes and small fish. Their width is about half their length.

Fluke, a type of flounder, are being  farm raised in open water by Mariculture Technologies in Greenport, New York.

Threats 

World stocks of large predatory fish and large ground fish, including sole and flounder, were estimated in 2003 to be only about 10% of pre-industrial levels, largely due to overfishing. Most overfishing is due to the extensive activities of the fishing industry. Current estimates suggest that approximately 30 million flounder (excluding sole) are alive in the world today. In the Gulf of Mexico, along the coast of Texas, research indicates the flounder population could be as low as 15 million due to heavy overfishing and industrial pollution.

References

External links 

 Common names containing "flounder" at FishBase
 

Commercial fish
Pleuronectiformes
Fish of Hawaii
Fish common names
Cuisine of the Southern United States
Hawaiian cuisine